The Kidwell-e Festival was intended to be  the UK's first literary festival dedicated to ebooks and digital publishing. The festival was devised by Julian Ruck author and columnistref></ref> It was to take place at the venue of Ffos Las racecourse near Kidwelly, in Carmarthenshire, across the weekend of 28–29 July 2012.

A major part of the festival was the Kidwell-e Ebook Awards, aimed at both unpublished and established authors. There was a £10,000 cash prize for the best unpublished or self-published e-book by a British author.

The event was poorly attended and cancelled after the first day.

References

Literary festivals in England